St. Gabriel's High School (abbreviated SGHS) is an educational institution located in Kazipet, in Warangal district of Telangana, India. It was established in 1955 by the late Rev. Bro. Vincent. The school is a Montfortian Institution.

History
St. Gabriel's High School, Kazipet (Co-Education) is a Minority institution, Established by 'The Brothers of St. Gabriel Educational Society' in June 1955. It is recognised by the Government of Telangana and runs classes from L.K.G. to X. It prepares students for S.S.C. Examination through English Medium.
The Society of the Montfort Brothers of St. Gabriel was founded by St. Louis Marie Grignion de Montfort (1673-1716) a Frenchman, for the education of Children and youth especially of the poor sections. The Society's priorities in education are not only academic excellence but also formation of the youth in discipline, hardwork, moral sensitivity to the rights and needs of others and religious tolerance. The students and their teachers are expected to imbibe the spirit of the Society and make these priorities their own.
It has dedicated and highly qualified teachers with a blend of experience and youth. The Institution has good reputation and excellent and consistent growth records.

Anthem and flag
The school anthem is "Lead, Kindly Light" written in 1833 by John Henry Newman. The school flag has two colors, olive green and white, and also the school emblem in the center , which are also the colors of the school uniform and its tie.

Academics
St. Gabriel's High School's curriculum is as prescribed by the Secondary School Certificate (SSC) board. The medium of instruction is English. It provides computer education to students from nursery-10thgrades.  The school's best performance was securing All India Open Category 1st rank in the IIT-JEE 2010 examination.

Sports
The school has a playground adjacent to the main block. It includes three Football courts, two Volleyball courts, a Netball court, and two Basketball courts. Two football courts put together made a Cricket ground.  Students have one drill period per week.
There is also one period for sports named as sports club

Competitions like the school level, inter school competitions, selections for the Montfort sports meet are held in the school.

Principals
Bro. Vincent (1955-1958)
Bro. John of god ( 1958–1962)
Bro. Eugenius ( 1962 – 1965)
Bro. Amancius (1965 – 1967)
Bro. Eugene Mary (1967-1971)
Bro. James Uralil (1971-1974)
Bro. Berchmanas (1974-1977)
Bro. Vincent (1977-
Bro. Lambert Mary (1980-1983)
Bro. Alexander (1983-1986)
Bro. Claude (1986-1989)
Bro. John Kallarackal (1989-1990)
Bro. M.P. Thomas (1990-1994)
Bro. K.T. Chacko (1994-1997)
Bro. John Kallarackal 1997-2000)
Bro. K.M. Joseph (2000-2004)
Bro. Bala Bhaskar. M (2004-2007)
Bro. P.T. Sebastian (2007-2013)
Bro. Roque D'Cuhna (2013-2015)
Bro. Maynard Heldt (2015-2017)
Bro. Jaico Gervasis (2017-2019)
Bro. Arun Prakash man (2019-)

Awards
Every year awards are given to the students with the best academic performance in each section in each class. Best Outgoing Student awards are given to the 10th students, who achieved excellence in academics, literary and cultural activities, and in NCC. A gold medal is given to the best outgoing student who gave the best all round performance.

References

External links
 1.SGHS Home page

Brothers of Christian Instruction of St Gabriel schools
Catholic secondary schools in India
Christian schools in Telangana
High schools and secondary schools in Telangana
Hanamkonda district
Educational institutions established in 1955
1955 establishments in India